Kannur State assembly constituency is one of the 140 state legislative assembly constituencies in Kerala state in southern India.  It is also one of the 7 state legislative assembly constituencies included in the Kannur Lok Sabha constituency.
 As of the 2021 assembly elections, the current MLA is Kadannappalli Ramachandran of Cong(S).

History
For the first election conducted to the Kerala Legislative Assembly in 1957, the Kannur city had two Assembly Constituencies - Cannanore-I and Cannanore - II. Following the 1965 delimitation, Cannanore - I Constituency was renamed as Kannur while Cannanore - II was replaced by newly formed Edakkad constituency.

In the 2008 delimitation of constituencies, a major portion of the erstwhile Kannur Assembly Constituency was replaced in Azhikode constituency. Edakkad constituency became defunct in 2011. A major portion of the erstwhile Edakkad constituency is now a part of the Kannur constituency. Currently, the Kannur Municipal Corporation has two assembly constituencies - Kannur and Azhikode.

Local Self Governed Segments
Kannur Niyamasabha constituency is composed of the following local self governed segments:

Members of Legislative Assembly 
The following list contains all members of the Kerala Legislative Assembly who have represented the constituency:

Key

As Cannanore I

As Kannur

* indicates bypolls

Election results

Niyamasabha Election 2021 
There were 1,73,961 registered voters in the constituency for the 2021 election.

Niyamasabha Election 2016 
There were 1,63,205 registered voters in the constituency for the 2016 election.

Niyamasabha Election 2011 
There were 1,43,828 registered voters in the constituency for the 2011 election.

See also
 Kannur
 Kannur district
 List of constituencies of the Kerala Legislative Assembly
 2016 Kerala Legislative Assembly election

References 

Assembly constituencies of Kerala

State assembly constituencies in Kannur district